Leandro Freire de Araújo (born 21 August 1989 in Brazil), sometimes known as just Freire, is a Brazilian football player who plays as a defender. He currently plays for FC Gifu in the J3 League.

Career
Previously he played for Vitória S.C. in the Primeira Liga.

On 28 March 2014, Freire signed for Kazakhstan Premier League side FC Ordabasy on a season-long-loan deal, returning to Nacional in January 2015.

On 14 February 2017, Freire was announced as a new signing for J.League side Shimizu S-Pulse.

Career statistics

Honours
Vitória de Guimarães
Taça de Portugal: 2012–13

Apollon
Cypriot Cup: 2015–16

References

External links
 

1989 births
Living people
Brazilian footballers
Brazilian expatriate footballers
Association football defenders
União São João Esporte Clube players
Paraná Clube players
Sport Club do Recife players
FC Ordabasy players
Vitória S.C. players
C.D. Nacional players
Apollon Limassol FC players
Shimizu S-Pulse players
Shonan Bellmare players
V-Varen Nagasaki players
FC Gifu players
Kazakhstan Premier League players
Primeira Liga players
J1 League players
J2 League players
J3 League players
Cypriot First Division players
Expatriate footballers in Kazakhstan
Expatriate footballers in Cyprus
Expatriate footballers in Japan
Brazilian expatriate sportspeople in Kazakhstan
Brazilian expatriate sportspeople in Cyprus
Brazilian expatriate sportspeople in Japan
Place of birth missing (living people)